Cimarron Range may refer to:

 Cimarron Range in the Sangre de Cristo Mountains in New Mexico
 Cimarron Ridge in the San Juan Mountains